The Canton of Aubagne-Est is a former canton located within the administrative department of Bouches-du-Rhône in southern France. It was created 27 February 2003 by the decree 2003-156 of that date. It had 40,778 inhabitants (2012). It was disbanded following the French canton reorganisation which came into effect in March 2015.

Elected to represent the canton in the General Council of Bouches-du-Rhône'' : 
 Roland Giberti (Nouveau Centre, 2004-2014)

Area
It was composed of the eastern half of Aubagne defined by a line through chemin de Font-de-Mai, route d'Eoure, A501 autoroute, avenue Roger-Salengro, avenue de Garlaban, the railway line and the chemin de Fenestrelle. It also contained the communes of Carnoux-en-Provence, Cassis, Cuges-les-Pins, Gémenos et Roquefort-la-Bédoule.

See also 
 Arrondissement of Marseille
 Cantons of the Bouches-du-Rhône department
 Communes of the Bouches-du-Rhône department

References

Aubagne-Est
2015 disestablishments in France
States and territories disestablished in 2015
2003 establishments in France